Klaus Jürgen Müller (born 6 February 1923 in Berlin, died 12 March 2010 in Bonn) was a German paleontologist.

In 1956, he described the Devonian conodont genus Palmatolepis.

In 1959, he described the Cambrian conodont genera Furnishina, Hertzina and Westergaardodina, and the conodont family Westergaardodinidae.

In 1962, he described the conodont order Paraconodontida.

Awards and tributes 
In 2003, he was awarded the Pander medal by the Pander Society, an informal organisation founded in 1967 for the promotion of the study of conodont palaeontology.

The conodont genus name Muellerilepis Bardashev & Bardasheva (2013) is a tribute to K.J.Müller. It is replacement generic name for Muellerina Bardashev et Bardasheva, 2012, which is a preoccupied name.

References 

Conodont specialists
German paleontologists
1923 births
2010 deaths
Members of the Royal Swedish Academy of Sciences